The Athabasca Chipewyan First Nation (ACFN) is a band government.  It represents local people of the Denesuline (Chipewyan) ethnic group.  It controls eight Indian reserves: Chipewyan 201 and Chipewyan 201A through Chipewyan 201G, near Fort Chipewyan, Alberta.  The band is party to Treaty 8, and is a member of the Athabasca Tribal Council.

The ancestors of today's ACFN were evicted from Wood Buffalo National Park by the Government of Canada beginning in 1944, according to research published by the band.

The band launched a court challenge in 2007 to an oilsands lease given to Shell Canada by the provincial government which, the band alleged, they were not given a chance to oppose.  In 2011, the band lost its suit, but planned to appeal to the Supreme Court of Canada.

The band was the focus of Neil Young's 2014 concert campaign against the Athabasca oil sands development.  In the wake of that the band withdrew from the Oil Sands Monitoring program, which they say lacks input from aboriginal peoples and does not address treaty rights.

Chief Allan Adam was arrested by the Royal Canadian Mounted Police in March 2020, tackling him and punching him severally in the head whilst he lay on the ground.

References

Further reading
Publications by the Athabasca Chipewyan First Nation

External links
First Nation homepage

First Nations governments in Alberta
Dene governments